San Francisco 4th and King Street station (previously 4th & Townsend), or Caltrain Depot is a train station in the SoMa district of San Francisco, California. It is presently the northern terminus of the Caltrain commuter rail line serving the San Francisco Peninsula and Santa Clara Valley. It is also the eastern terminus of the N Judah and E Embarcadero, as well as a stop along the T Third Street of the Muni network. The station is additionally the projected terminus for the first phase of the California High-Speed Rail project and a station once Phase 2 is completed.

History 

The station is in the Mission Bay/China Basin area, bordered on the north by Townsend Street, east by 4th Street, and south by King Street. All 13 tracks approaching from the west presently terminate here, just short of 4th Street. The facility opened on June 21, 1975, replacing a station built in 1914 at 3rd and Townsend, one block away to the east.

4th & King is one block from Oracle Park, the home ballpark of the San Francisco Giants of Major League Baseball. Caltrain runs extra trains on game days to shuttle fans to and from the ballpark.

The Muni light-rail extension to the station was opened in 1998.

Future 
The Downtown Rail Extension project to the rebuilt Transbay Terminal includes the construction of an underground 4th and King station. The underground portion will be adjacent to the current station on the Townsend Street side, but Caltrain will continue using the surface platforms. Until that time, California High-Speed Rail trains are planned to utilize the existing station with modifications for that service.

Following the opening of the Downtown Rail Extension project, California High-Speed Rail service will be extended to the new Transbay Terminal, though most trains are intended to stop at the underground 4th and Townsend as an additional, secondary stop for San Francisco.

Muni service 

4th and King hosts a number of Muni bus lines, the E Embarcadero historic streetcar line, the Muni Metro N Judah light rail line runs to Market St downtown, and the Metro’s T Third Street service runs to Chinatown via Muni's Central Subway.

The N Judah station platform is located on the median of King Street immediately southwest of the 4th and King intersection, while The T Third Street station platform is located on the median of 4th Street immediately southeast of the intersection. The nearest BART access is the Powell Street station, a  walk up 4th street then left on Market St or a nine minute T ride and a five minute walk.

Notes

References

External links 

Caltrain – San Francisco station

Caltrain stations in San Francisco
Muni Metro stations
South of Market, San Francisco
Railway stations in the United States opened in 1975
San Francisco Municipal Railway streetcar stations
1975 establishments in California
Proposed California High-Speed Rail stations
Former Southern Pacific Railroad stations in California